In Shinto shrine architecture, the  is the hall of worship or oratory. It is generally placed in front of the shrine's main sanctuary (honden) and often built on a larger scale than the latter. The haiden is often connected to the honden by a heiden, or hall of offerings. While the honden is the place for the enshrined kami and off-limits to the general public, the haiden provides a space for ceremonies and for worshiping the kami. In some cases, for example at Nara's Ōmiwa Shrine, the honden can be missing and be replaced by a patch of sacred ground. In that case, the haiden is the most important building of the complex.

References

Shinto architecture